Lusby may refer to:

Lusby, Lincolnshire
Lusby, Maryland